Ctesiphon was a city in Mesopotamia that was intermittently the capital of the Arsacid and Sassanid Empires.

Ctesiphon may also refer to:
 Ctesiphon Arch, last remaining part of Ctesiphon city
 Ctesiphon of Vergium, a 1st-century missionary and the patron saint of Berja, Spain
 Ctesiphon (orator), an Athenian orator of the 4th century BCE
 Patriarchal Province of Seleucia-Ctesiphon, central ecclesiastical province of the Church of the East